Eupograpta is a genus of spiders in the family Miturgidae. It was first described in 2009 by Raven. , it contains 2 Australian species.

References

Miturgidae
Araneomorphae genera
Spiders of Australia